Robert Broughton Lansdown   (9 May 1921 – 6 May 2006) was a senior Australian public servant and policymaker.

Life and career
Bob Lansdown was born on 9 May 1921 in East Maitland.  At the age of 14, he first joined the Australian Public Service, as a post office bicycle messenger in Strathfield.

During World War II, Lansdown joined the Second Australian Imperial Force, serving in the Middle East and New Guinea.

Lansdown first rejoined the Australian Public Service in 1950 as a Private Secretary in the Prime Minister's Department.

In December 1972 Lansdown was appointed Secretary of the Department of Urban and Regional Development and he remained head of the department when it was transitioned to Department of Environment, Housing and Community Development.

Between July 1979 and November 1980, Lansdown served as Secretary of the Postal and Telecommunications Department. He was the inaugural head of the Department of Communications when the Postal and Communications Department was abolished.

In 1986, Lansdown retired from the public service.

Awards and honours
Lansdown was made a Commander of the Order of the British Empire for housing, environment and community development in 1977. In 1991 he was made an Officer of the Order of Australia for service to communications.

In 2009, a street in the Canberra suburb of Casey was named Lansdown Crescent in Bob Lansdown's honour.

References

Australian public servants
1921 births
2006 deaths
University of Sydney alumni
Australian Commanders of the Order of the British Empire
Officers of the Order of Australia
20th-century Australian public servants
Australian Army personnel of World War II